Ținutul Mureș (or Ținutul Alba Iulia) was one of the ten ținuturi ("lands") of Romania, founded in 1938 after King Carol II initiated an institutional reform by modifying the 1923 Constitution and the law of territorial administration. It comprised most of Transylvania, and included parts of the Székely Land. Its capital was the city of Alba-Iulia. Ținutul Mureș ceased to exist following the territorial losses of Romania to Hungary and the king's abdication in 1940.

Coat of arms

The coat of arms is party per cross in 9 equal squares, representing the former 9 counties (ținuturi) of Greater Romania (71 in total) which it had included. Four of the squares, forming the arms of a Greek cross, are of or. The four squares forming the corners of the shield are of azure. The square in the heart of the shield is gules, and bares an or Romanian Crown (in recollection of the 1922 Alba-Iulia coronation of Ferdinand I and Marie of Edinburgh as King and Queen of Greater Romania).

Former counties incorporated
After the 1938 Administrative and Constitutional Reform, the previous 71 counties lost their authority. 
Alba County
Ciuc County
Făgăraș County
Mureș County
Năsăud County
Odorhei County
Sibiu County
Târnava Mare County
Târnava Micǎ County

In 1939 Năsăud County was ceded to Ținutul Crișuri in exchange for Turda County.

See also
 Historical administrative divisions of Romania
 Centru (development region)
 History of Romania

External links
Map

Mures
20th century in Transylvania
1938 establishments in Romania
1940 disestablishments in Romania
States and territories established in 1938
States and territories disestablished in 1940